Cassini is a lunar impact crater that is located in the Palus Nebularum, at the eastern end of Mare Imbrium. The crater was named after astronomers Giovanni Cassini and Jacques Cassini. To the northeast is the Promontorium Agassiz, the southern tip of the Montes Alpes mountain range. South by south-east of Cassini is the crater Theaetetus. To the northwest is the lone peak Mons Piton.

Description
The floor of Cassini is flooded, and is likely as old as the surrounding mare. The surface is peppered with a multitude of impacts, including a pair of significant craters contained entirely within the rim. Cassini A is the larger of these two, and it lies just north-east of the crater center. A hilly ridge area runs from this inner crater toward the south-east. Near the south-west rim of Cassini is the smaller crater Cassini B.

The walls of this crater are narrow and irregular in form but remain intact despite the lava flooding. Beyond the crater rim is a significant and irregular outer rampart.

For unknown reasons, this crater was omitted from early maps of the Moon. This crater is not of recent origin, however, so the omission was most likely an error on the part of the map-makers.

Satellite craters 

By convention these features are identified on lunar maps by placing the letter on the side of the crater midpoint that is closest to Cassini.

See also 
 Cassini (Martian crater)

References 

 
 
 
 
 
 
 
 
 
 
 

Impact craters on the Moon
Moon